Andreas Ludwig Karl Theodor Freiherr von Budberg-Bönninghausen (born Riga, 1 January 1817 – died St Petersburg, 28 January 1881) was a Russian Empire diplomat.

Life 
His father was Theodor Otto von Budberg-Bönninghausen (1779–1840), a Colonel in the Imperial Russian Army and his mother was Baroness Helene Juliane von Budberg (1787–1856, daughter of Foreign Minister Andrei von Budberg), from an old Baltic German family. After attending the cathedral school at Reval, Budberg continued his education at St Petersburg and entered the Russian diplomatic service in 1841.

In 1845 he was joined the Russian embassy at the German Bundestag in Frankfurt, becoming chargé d'affaires there in 1848. In 1850 he played the same role for Prussia in Berlin, being promoted to ambassador in 1851. In 1856 he became the Russian ambassador to Austria at Vienna, returning to Berlin between 1858 and 1862. Then he was appointed Russian ambassador to France, a role he fulfilled until 1868.

In 1862 with Budberg's agreement the French political police arrested in emissaries of Central National Committee (Komitet Centralny Narodowy), a secret  Polish organization, who were returning from London. Just before the January Uprising, the French handed Budberg a list of all conspiring regiments and a description of roads used to smuggle weapons for polish insurgents from abroad.

Whilst in Berlin he lived in the former Amalienpalais, in Unter den Linden.

He was greatly interested in Japan and knew Philipp Franz von Siebold. He was also closely connected with Count Karl Robert von Nesselrode, Grand Duke Konstantin and Baron Wadenstierna.

References

External links 
 Genealogisches Handbuch der baltischen Ritterschaften, Teil 1, 2: Livland, Lfg. 9-15, Görlitz 1929, pp.657

Ambassadors of the Russian Empire to Austria
Ambassadors of the Russian Empire to France
Baltic-German people
1817 births
1881 deaths
19th-century people from the Russian Empire